Thomas Pang Cheung-wai, SBS, JP (born 1954) is the current vice-chairman of the Democratic Alliance for the Betterment and Progress of Hong Kong (DAB), the largest pro-Beijing party in Hong Kong.

Career
Pang has been serving in the Sha Tin District for many years. He was first elected to the Sha Tin District Board in the 1991 District Board elections in the Fo Tan constituency. He subsequently joined the Democratic Alliance for the Betterment of Hong Kong (DAB) and won a seat in the Regional Council in the 1995 municipal elections. After the establishment of the Special Administrative Region, he was the member of the Provisional Sha Tin District Board and Provisional Regional Council until the Regional Council was abolished in 1999. In 1998 Legislative Council elections, he failed to get a seat in the Election Committee constituency. In 2000 Legislative Council elections, he ran against Liberal Party's Miriam Lau in the Transport functional constituency but was defeated.

Since the 1999 District Council elections, he has been representing the Sui Wo constituency and is the vice-chairman of the Sha Tin District Council. Through the New Territories District Councils Subsector, he has been member of the Election Committee since 2000.

Pang has been the secretary general of the DAB. In 2013, he became the delegate to the National Committee of the Chinese People's Political Consultative Conference (CPPCC), China's top national consultative body. and also the vice-chairman of the DAB.

Pang has also been appointed to various public positions including member of the Appeal Board on Closure Orders (Immediate Health Hazard), Environmental Campaign Committee, Hospital Authority New Territories Regional Advisory Committee, Intangible Cultural Heritage Advisory Committee, Independent Police Complaints Council (IPCC) Observers, and Municipal Services Appeals Board.

He was made Justices of the Peace on 1 July 2003 and was awarded the Bronze Bauhinia Star in 2008.

References

1954 births
Living people
Hong Kong Anglicans
District councillors of Sha Tin District
Members of the Regional Council of Hong Kong
Democratic Alliance for the Betterment and Progress of Hong Kong politicians
Members of the Election Committee of Hong Kong, 2000–2005
Members of the Election Committee of Hong Kong, 2007–2012
Members of the Election Committee of Hong Kong, 2012–2017
Members of the Election Committee of Hong Kong, 2017–2021
Members of the 13th Chinese People's Political Consultative Conference
Members of the National Committee of the Chinese People's Political Consultative Conference
Recipients of the Bronze Bauhinia Star
Recipients of the Silver Bauhinia Star